The 1988–89 FIS Ski Jumping World Cup was the tenth World Cup season in ski jumping. It began in Thunder Bay, Canada on 3 December 1988 and finished in Planica, Yugoslavia on 26 March 1989. The individual World Cup was won by Jan Boklöv and Nations Cup by Norway.

Map of world cup hosts 
All 15 locations which have been hosting world cup events for men this season. Events in Falun and Bærum canceled. Harrachov hosted ski flying and large hill event.

 Four Hills Tournament
 Bohemia Tournament

Calendar

Men

Standings

Overall

Nations Cup

Four Hills Tournament

References 

World cup
World cup
FIS Ski Jumping World Cup